WVNC-LD (channel 45) is a low-power television station in Watertown, New York, United States, affiliated with NBC and owned by SagamoreHill Broadcasting. The station's studios are located at Public Square in downtown Watertown, and its transmitter is located along NY 126/State Street on Champion Hill.

Due to WVNC-LD's low-power status, its broadcast radius only covers the immediate Watertown area. Therefore, it must rely on cable and satellite to reach the entire market.

History
Although the channel 45 frequency had never been used in Watertown prior to 2015, the adjacent channel 46 was the home of WLOT-LP, Watertown's UPN affiliate, until its owner died in 2005 and the station went dark (its frequency has never been reactivated and would eventually be taken out of service in the late-2010s spectrum reallocation).

On August 28, 2016, the Federal Communications Commission (FCC) approved the transfer of control of a low-power digital television license in Watertown, W45EI-D, from Sunrise, Florida-based DTV America Corporation to SagamoreHill Broadcasting. The new owners promptly renamed the station WVNC-LD and signed it to an affiliation deal with NBC, giving the Watertown area its first locally-based full-time NBC affiliate. The new station signed on December 1, 2016. Prior to WVNC-LD's sign-on, North Country cable systems received either WSTM-TV in Syracuse or WPTZ in Plattsburgh, depending on the location. WWNY-TV previously had a secondary affiliation with the network until 1995. WPTZ and WSTM-TV are still available on cable along with WVNC-LD.

Programming
WVNC-LD's main channel clears the entire NBC schedule, including The More You Know, NBC's E/I-compliant block which, as a low-power station, it is not required to clear. Syndicated programming on WVNC-LD includes Family Feud, Access Hollywood, and The Kelly Clarkson Show.

In addition to NBC programming, WVNC-LD operates the Watertown market's Antenna TV affiliate on its LD2 subchannel. On weeknights, WVNC-LD2 also carries programs from the MyNetworkTV programming service, filling in programming for all time slots outside of the MyNetworkTV programming schedule with the Antenna TV schedule.

News operation
WVNC-LD currently does not air any local news programming; station officials stated at its launch that planning was underway to open a news department by early 2018. , there is still no local news available on WVNC-LD.

Subchannels
The station's digital signal is multiplexed:

References

External links

SagamoreHill Broadcasting
Television channels and stations established in 2016
2016 establishments in New York (state)
VNC-LD
NBC network affiliates
Antenna TV affiliates
MyNetworkTV affiliates
Ion Television affiliates
Grit (TV network) affiliates
Bounce TV affiliates
Court TV affiliates